Platt Whitman (February 6, 1871September 11, 1935) was an American lawyer, banker, and Republican politician.  He served four years in the Wisconsin State Senate (1915–1919) and two years in the Assembly (1909–1911), representing Iowa County.

Biography
Whitman was born in Dodgeville, Wisconsin. He graduated from the University of Wisconsin-Madison in 1893 and the University of Wisconsin Law School in 1895.

He died in Rochester, Minnesota, on September 11, 1935, and is interred in the East Side Cemetery in Dodgeville near the Jones-Owens Mausoleum.

His father was Joel Whitman.

Career
Whitman was elected to the Assembly in 1908. Later, he was a member of the Senate from the 17th district from 1915 to 1918. He was a Republican.

References

External links

1871 births
1935 deaths
People from Dodgeville, Wisconsin
Republican Party Wisconsin state senators
Republican Party members of the Wisconsin State Assembly
University of Wisconsin–Madison alumni
University of Wisconsin Law School alumni